Faghani may refer to:
Alireza Faghani (born 1978), Iranian international football referee
Faghani language, spoken in the Solomon Islands